Premier Rides is an amusement ride manufacturer based in the United States. The company was the first to use Linear Induction Motors (LIMs) on their roller coasters. Jim Seay has been the sole owner and company president since 1996.

The first roller coaster by Premier Rides was Runaway Mountain at Six Flags Over Texas, which opened on June 12, 1996.

List of roller coasters

As of 2019, Premier Rides has built 36 roller coasters around the world. Premier Rides was also the broker involved with the High Roller steel roller coaster at the Stratosphere in Las Vegas. However, the ride was manufactured by S&MC.

Notes

References

External links

 

Roller coaster manufacturers
Companies established in 1995
Manufacturing companies based in Baltimore